Tréméven may refer to the two communes in Brittany, France:
Tréméven, Côtes-d'Armor, in the Côtes-d'Armor department
Tréméven, Finistère, in the Finistère department